In graph theory, the Gallai–Hasse–Roy–Vitaver theorem is a form of duality between the colorings of the vertices of a given undirected graph and the orientations of its edges. It states that the minimum number of colors needed to properly color any graph  equals one plus the length of a longest path in an orientation of  chosen to minimize this path's  The orientations for which the longest path has minimum length always include at least one 

This theorem implies that every orientation of a graph with  contains a simple directed path with  this path can be constrained to begin at any vertex that can reach all other vertices of the oriented

Examples
A bipartite graph may be oriented from one side of the bipartition to the other. The longest path in this orientation has length two, with only two vertices. Conversely, if a graph is oriented without any three-vertex paths, then every vertex must either be a source (with no incoming edges) or a sink (with no outgoing edges) and the partition of the vertices into sources and sinks shows that it is 

In any orientation of a cycle graph of odd length, it is not possible for the edges to alternate in orientation all around the cycle, so some two consecutive edges must form a path with three vertices. Correspondingly, the chromatic number of an odd cycle is three.

Proof
To prove that the chromatic number is greater than or equal to the minimum number of vertices in a longest path, suppose that a given graph has a coloring with  colors, for some number . Then it may be acyclically oriented by numbering colors and by directing each edge from its lower-numbered endpoint to the higher-numbered endpoint. With this orientation, the numbers are strictly increasing along each directed path, so each path can include at most one vertex of each color, for a total of at most  vertices per 

To prove that the chromatic number is less than or equal to the minimum number of vertices in a longest path, suppose that a given graph has an orientation with at most  vertices per simple directed path, for some  Then the vertices of the graph may be colored with  colors by choosing a maximal acyclic subgraph of the orientation, and then coloring each vertex by the length of the longest path in the chosen subgraph that ends at that vertex. Each edge within the subgraph is oriented from a vertex with a lower number to a vertex with a higher number, and is therefore properly colored. For each edge that is not in the subgraph, there must exist a directed path within the subgraph connecting the same two vertices in the opposite direction, for otherwise the edge could have been included in the chosen subgraph; therefore, the edge is oriented from a higher number to a lower number and is again properly 

The proof of this theorem was used as a test case for a formalization of mathematical induction by

Category-theoretic interpretation
The theorem also has a natural interpretation in the category of directed graphs and graph homomorphisms. A homomorphism is a map from the vertices of one graph to the vertices of another that always maps edges to edges.

Considering homomorphisms in the other direction,  instead of  a directed  has at most  vertices in its longest path if and only if there is no homomorphism from the path graph  

History and related results
Rédei's theorem follows immediately from the Gallai–Hasse–Roy–Vitaver theorem applied to an undirected complete graph. 

Instead of orienting a graph to minimize the length of its longest path, it is also natural to maximize the length of the shortest path, for a strong orientation (one in which every pair of vertices has a shortest path). Having a strong orientation requires that the given undirected graph be a bridgeless graph. For these graphs, it is always possible to find a strong orientation in which, for some pair of vertices, the shortest path length equals the length of the longest path in the given undirected

References

Graph coloring
Theorems in graph theory
Duality theories